Harwich International railway station on the Mayflower Line, a branch of the Great Eastern Main Line, serves Harwich International Port in Essex, England. Its three-letter station code, HPQ, derives from its original name, Harwich Parkeston Quay.

The station is operated by Abellio Greater Anglia, which also runs all trains serving the station. It is the eastern terminus in England of the Dutchflyer service between London and Amsterdam.

Description
The station has two entrances. One is located on the ground floor of the passenger terminal building which houses a ticket machine, and provides step free direct access to platform 1 and indirect access to platforms 2 and 3 via a footbridge. The second entrance is from a car-park via the footbridge, with step free access being provided by a lift which is in service until the evening ferry sailing to Hook of Holland has departed. The platforms can also be accessed via a level crossing at the eastern end of the platforms.

Generally platform 1 is used as the terminus of Dutchflyer trains towards London. The platforms have an operational length for thirteen-coach trains.

History

The port and station owe their origins to the Great Eastern Railway (GER) which opened them on a new track alignment built over reclaimed land in 1883 and named them after its chairman, Charles Henry Parkes. The original combined station building and hotel is still in existence although the hotel is now converted for office use and is part of the port terminal.

This was supplemented by a bay platform at the eastern end of the main platform (the present-day platform 1) which handled Harwich to Parkeston local services, which in the days of steam generally consisted of a J15 and later  N2 or N7 tank engines and up to four carriages. This service was timed to suit shift times both on the quay and in adjoining offices, the majority of workers being railway employees. The bay also had a loop allowing the running round of the locomotive. The main platform was and still is of sufficient length to accommodate a boat train of 10 or 11 coaches. The "up" (westbound) through-platform was shorter but this did not prevent it being used by the North Country boat train in the morning, which consisted of 11 or 12 carriages and would overhang the end of the platform considerably, but in those days there was no level crossing at the eastern end of the station.

The Manningtree to Harwich local service used the last one-third of the main platform using a third central access line, which joined the platform at that point allowing a ticket barrier to be used for that part of the platform exclusively. This arrangement allowed a five- or six-coach train to sit at the western end of that platform without the need for any shifting, whereas a full boat train would have to move temporarily towards the west to allow the local train access.

During the peak years of foot passenger movements through the quay, before the introduction of the roll-on/roll-off ferries and the rationalisation of the ferry services that followed, another station operated at the western end of Parkeston Quay, known as Parkeston Quay West. It consisted of a single platform and was capable of handling a 10- or 11-coach boat train. It serviced the day service to the Hoek van Holland Haven (Hook of Holland Harbour) and was also used by troop trains during the period when trooping was still a major operation through the port. Its position afforded exactly the same close proximity to the ferry as the main station.

Parkeston Quay was the base port for three troop ships serving the British Army of the Rhine operation in Germany via the Hook of Holland. The vessels employed were the Vienna, Empire Parkeston and Empire Wansbeck.

The extensive marshalling yard to the west of the main station provided stabling for the carriage sets which were used on the boat trains and local services, the large numbers of lorries used for servicing Parkeston Quay, and the huge throughput of export and import wagons which were shipped over the train ferry service from Harwich Town. Cargoes were assembled at Parkeston and brought to Harwich for a specific sailing, as there was no long-term storage capacity at the ferry terminal. Import wagons were subject to customs clearance at Parkeston and delays could at times be considerable on individual wagons, cargoes having arrived from various European origins.

The type of unit passing through the marshalling yard changed towards the end of the century as container or freightliner flats and car flats replaced ferry wagons. The boat trains also declined as passenger trends changed and today there are no dedicated boat trains except for specials servicing cruise vessels.

Engine shed

In the 1870s the building of Parkeston Quay had started and land to the east of that site was allocated for the new engine shed which opened in March 1883. The shed was a four-road brick-built straight-shed with an outdoor turntable located between the shed and running lines. Access to the shed was from the Harwich direction and the shed was provided with coaling and watering facilities. In the 1890s the shed was equipped to deal with some repairs although these were generally undertaken at Ipswich engine shed further down-line.

A new, larger turntable was provided on the site in 1912 and this was installed in time for the delivery of the 1500 class 4-6-0 locomotives, the first of which was allocated to Parkeston. It is probably about this time that access to the shed was improved with a link from the east end of Parkeston Quay station supplementing the existing access.

The shed was part of the Ipswich district (referred to as the Eastern district after 1915).

1923 allocation
At the end of the Great Eastern Railway the following locomotives were allocated to Parkeston:

Post-grouping
In 1930 improved coal facilities were introduced along with a water softening plant in 1935.

During the Second World War the depot would have dealt with significant traffic for the Royal Navy as Harwich was a base for Destroyers.

British Railways
In the 1950s Britannia Class locomotives allocated to Stratford engine shed worked the Liverpool boat trains although these were usually worked by Parkeston crews. The Thompson B1 class 4-6-0 class worked many of the other longer distance trains and at the time Parkeston was the port through which many British Army on the Rhine troops passed through with special trains sometimes running in connection with this traffic.

The shed was re-roofed in 1950.

By the mid- to late-1950s the number of steam locomotives had declined. Ian Allan's Locoshed Book listed just 24 on 11 May 1957, (nine B1s, nine J39s, three J15s, one J68 and two N7s). The numbers of shunting and tank engines had been reduced by the arrival of diesel powered units  and diesel multiple units had begun to work local services. There were still 33 units allocated overall to the shed in 1959 but by 1967 the facility had been demolished.

The Thompson B1s were well suited to the boat train and fast freight traffic, although much of the motive power for the boat trains was provided by Stratford, including Britannia Pacifics when they became more available after the second large batch of the type had been delivered to the Eastern Region. They were regularly accommodated overnight.

The demolition of the locomotive shed allowed the construction of the new Freightliner terminal on the site, which opened in May 1968. The Seafreightliner service operated two sailings per day to Zeebrugge and one sailing per day to Rotterdam, the latter in a joint service with its Dutch counterparts.

These were mainly hauled by Class 47s to the north (though other classes such as Class 45s were also used) and Class 37s and 47s to London, though once the Mayflower Line was electrified by British Rail, Class 86s replaced the 37s and 47s, but these were in turn replaced by Dutchflyer services. The locomotive-hauled services to the north were replaced by diesel multiple units and truncated to Peterborough.

Historical services

Boat trains commenced running to Harwich Parkeston Quay in 1882 and were timed 1 hour 45 minutes from London Liverpool Street. By 1895 this was down to 1 hour 30 minutes. In 1897 the 8:30 pm train was run as two separate trains - 8:30 pm for the Hook of Holland Harbour and 8:35 pm for Antwerp. With the introduction of corridor restaurant cars in 1904, the time was eased to 1 hour 27 minutes, but the introduction of the large Great Eastern 1500 class 4-6-0 engines in 1912 saw a running time of 1 hour 22 minutes.

This train included the first restaurant car on the Great Eastern line (in 1891) and this was also the first service in the country to allow third-class passengers to dine. A new train set was built for this service in 1906 and generally operated in the following formation:

ENGINE+THIRD CLASS BRAKE+CORRIDOR THIRD+OPEN THIRD+KITCHEN AND OPEN FIRST+SEMI-OPEN FIRST+SIX WHEEL BRAKE (this constituted the York section). Then followed various corridor composite brakes followed each detached from the rear of the northbound train en route. These were for LIVERPOOL (detached Doncaster on the outward journey)+ LIVERPOOL + MANCHESTER (detached at Lincoln and routed via the Great Central routes) + BIRMINGHAM (via Midland Railway routes) + BIRMINGHAM (via London and North Western routes)(both of which were detached at March).

Current services
 the typical daily service on the line is one train per hour in each direction, although some additional services run at weekday peak times. These are operated by bi-mode multiple units (0750 to Cambridge and 2147 to Lowestoft) as the lines to Cambridge via Bury St Edmunds and Lowestoft are not electrified.

References

Railway stations in Essex
DfT Category E stations
Railway stations in Great Britain opened in 1883
Former Great Eastern Railway stations
Railway stations serving harbours and ports in the United Kingdom
Greater Anglia franchise railway stations
Railway depots in England
Harwich